Al-Mutawakkil III (died 1543) was the seventeenth Abbasid caliph of Cairo for the Mamluk Sultanate from 1508 to 1516, and again in 1517.

Life 
He was the last caliph of the later Egyptian-based Caliphate. Since the Mongol sack of Baghdad and the execution of Caliph Al-Musta'sim in 1258, these Cairene Caliphs had resided in Cairo as nominal rulers used to legitimize the actual rule of the Mamluk sultans.

Al-Mutawakkil III was deposed briefly in 1516 by his predecessor Al-Mustamsik, but was restored to the office the following year. In 1517, Ottoman Sultan Selim I had managed to defeat the Mamluk Sultanate, and made Egypt part of the Ottoman Empire. Al-Mutawakkil III was captured together with his family and transported to Constantinople. 

According to traditional history, at this time he formally surrendered the title of caliph as well as its outward emblems—the sword and mantle of Muhammad—to Ottoman sultan Selim I. This story does not appear in the literature until the 1780s and was advanced to bolster the claims of caliphal jurisdiction over Muslims outside of the empire, as asserted in the 1774 Treaty of Küçük Kaynarca.

References

Bibliography

1543 deaths
16th-century Abbasid caliphs
Year of birth unknown